A. W. Watkins (1 December 1895 – February 1970) was an English sound engineer. He was nominated for four Academy Awards in the category Best Sound Recording.

Selected filmography
 Goodbye, Mr. Chips (1939)
 Knights of the Round Table (1953)
 Libel (1959)
 Doctor Zhivago (1965)

References

External links

1895 births
1970 deaths
English audio engineers
People from Kidderminster